Filatov is a common Russian surname. Notable people with the surname include:
 Alexander Filatov (born 1940), Russian politician
 Anatoli Filatov (born 1975), Kazakhstani ice hockey player
 Andrey Filatov (born 1971), Russian entrepreneur
 Antonin Filatov, Russian surgeon and hematologist
 Borys Filatov (born 1972), Ukrainian politician
 Dmitry Filatov (scientist), Soviet embryologist
 Dmitri Filatov (born 1977), Russian football player
 Irina Filatova (born 1978), Russian politician 
 Leonid Filatov (1946–2003), Russian/Soviet actor, writer and director
 Nikita Filatov (born 1990), Russian ice hockey player
 Nikolai Filatov (1862–1935), Russian scientist in the field of theory of shooting
 Nil Filatov (1847–1902), Russian physician
 Pavel Filatov (1887–), Russian fencer 
Pyotr Filatov (1893–1941), Soviet general
 Sergey Alexandrovich Filatov (born 1936), Russian politician
 Sergei Filatov (1926–1997), Soviet equestrian
 Tarja Filatov (born 1963), Finnish politician
 Valentin Filatov (animal trainer), Soviet circus artist
 Valentin Filatov (born 1982), Russian footballer
 Valeri Filatov (born 1950), Russian/Soviet football player
 Vera Filatova (born 1982), Ukrainian actress
 Viktor Filatov, Russian journalist
 Vladimir Filatov (1875–1956), Russian-Ukrainian ophthalmologist and surgeon
 Yuri Filatov (born 1948), Ukrainian flatwater canoer
 Filatov & Karas, a Russian group

Russian-language surnames